Murray Robert Kuntz (born December 19, 1945) is a former professional ice hockey right winger. He played seven games in the National Hockey League with the St. Louis Blues in the 1974–75 season. He was born in Ottawa, Ontario. He is the son of former NHL player Alan Kuntz.

External links

1945 births
Living people
Baltimore Clippers players
Beauce Jaros players
Canadian ice hockey right wingers
Cincinnati Swords players
Denver Spurs players
Rochester Americans players
St. Louis Blues players
Springfield Indians players
Syracuse Eagles players
Ice hockey people from Ottawa